Achherr Bhaardwaj is an Indian television actor, known for his role Mukund Agarwal in Tu Mera Hero.

Television

References

External links 
 

1987 births
21st-century Indian actors
Indian television actors
Living people